Platanthera bifolia, commonly known as the lesser butterfly-orchid, is a species of orchid in the genus Platanthera, having certain relations with the genus Orchis, where it was previously included and also with the genus Habenaria. It is a Palaearctic species occurring from Ireland in the west, across Europe and Asia to Korea and Japan. It is also found in North Africa. The name Platanthera is derived from Greek, meaning "broad anthers", while the species name, bifolia, means "two leaves".

Identification 

Lesser butterfly-orchids are not to be confused with the greater butterfly-orchid, which are about the same size. Lesser butterfly-orchids are distinguished by their two shining green basal leaves, especially of the hill form, which are shorter and broader and by the angle of the pollinia. The upper sepal and petals form a loose triangular hood above the pollinia, which lie parallel and close together, obscuring the opening into the spur, which is long and almost straight. There are usually around 25 white flowers tinged with yellow-green in a slim flower spike. The flowers are night-scented, but the chemical components of the scent are different from those of greater butterfly-orchid and attract different pollinators.

Hybrids 
Hybrids of the two butterfly-orchids are rare, as are those between lesser butterfly-orchid and other species. However, hybrids have been recorded with frog orchid in South Uist (1949) and with the common spotted-orchid and the heath spotted-orchid.

Habitat 
The lesser butterfly-orchid occupies a wide range of habitats, being far more tolerant of acid conditions than the greater butterfly-orchid. They are found in grasslands, woodlands (especially beech woods in southern England), in hill pastures up to 400m, on heaths and moorland, and in tussocky marshy ground.

Pollination 
Sphingid moths are attracted by the scent of this orchid, and tend to hover in front of the flowers, resting their forelegs on the lip. As the proboscis enters the spur it pushes between the pollinia, dislodging the sticky discs which adhere to it. Pollinators include pine, small elephant and, to a lesser extent, elephant hawk-moths.

Conservation 
This species has suffered a serious decline, especially in central and southern England, as a result of woodland clearance. Upland populations in the north and west have suffered from overgrazing.

References

External links 
 
 
 
  Den virtuella floran - Distribution

bifolia
Plants described in 1753
Taxa named by Carl Linnaeus
Orchids of Europe
Orchids of Asia
Orchids of Korea
Orchids of Japan